Buffalo (originally Buffalo Creek) was a railway station on the South Gippsland line in South Gippsland, Victoria. The station was opened during the 1890s and operated until 1981 when the line to Barry Beach servicing the oil fields in Bass Strait was closed. The line was then dismantled and turned into the Great Southern Rail Trail. All that remains at Buffalo is a Pivot Shed, platform mound and a buffer stop.  The line to Barry Beach was later dismantled in 1994 and turned into the Great Southern Rail Trail, to Foster.

Disused railway stations in Victoria (Australia)
Transport in Gippsland (region)
Shire of South Gippsland